H. D. Deve Gowda was sworn in as Prime Minister of India on 1 June 1996. In his initial ministry the ministers were as follows.

Cabinet ministers

 

|}

Ministers of State

 R. Dhanuskodi Athithan, Department of Youth Affairs and Sports in the Ministry of Human Resource Development.
 M. P. Veerendra Kumar Ministry of Finance
 Mohammed Maqbool Dar, Ministry of Home Affairs.
 Muhi Ram Saikia, Department of Education in the Ministry of Human Resource Development. 
 N. V. N. Somu, Ministry of Defence.
 Satpal Maharaj, Ministry of Railways.
 S. R. Balasubramaniam, Ministry of Personnel, Public Grievances and Pensions and Ministry of Parliamentary Affairs.
 T. R. Baalu, Ministry of Petroleum and Natural Gas.

References

External links 
 Prime Minister, H.D. Deve Gowda: The Gain and the Pain : (a Biographical Study)

Indian union ministries
1996 establishments in India
Gowda administration
1997 disestablishments in India
Cabinets established in 1996
Cabinets disestablished in 1997
Janata Dal
Communist Party of India
Tamil Maanila Congress
Samajwadi Party
Dravida Munnetra Kazhagam
Telugu Desam Party
Maharashtrawadi Gomantak Party
Asom Gana Parishad
Jammu & Kashmir National Conference
All India Indira Congress (Tiwari)